Arsen Gitinov (born 1 June 1977 in Tlondoda, Dagestan ASSR) is a Russian and Kyrgyzstani male freestyle wrestler from Dagestan. He participated in Men's freestyle 74 kg at 2008 Summer Olympics. After defeating Krystian Brzozowski and Ibrahim Aldatov in the preliminary rounds, he was eliminated in the quarterfinals by Kiril Terziev.

Representing Russia, he was a silver medalist of Men's freestyle 69kg at the 2000 Summer Olympics.

External links
 
Wrestler bio on beijing2008.com

1977 births
Living people
People from Tsumadinsky District
Olympic wrestlers of Kyrgyzstan
Olympic wrestlers of Russia
Kyrgyzstani people of Dagestani descent
Kyrgyzstani male sport wrestlers
Wrestlers at the 2008 Summer Olympics
Wrestlers at the 2000 Summer Olympics
Russian male sport wrestlers
Olympic silver medalists for Russia
Olympic medalists in wrestling
Medalists at the 2000 Summer Olympics
Sportspeople from Dagestan